List of captains of the Ukrainian football club Dynamo Kyiv.

External links 
 Statistics of Dynamo Kyiv

FC Dynamo Kyiv